Sants-Badal is a neighborhood in the Sants-Montjuïc district of Barcelona, Catalonia (Spain). It belonged to the former municipality of Sants, current district of Sants-Montjuïc. Extending 0,41 km2 and with a population of 23,987 it is the most densely populated neighborhood in the city with a density of 58,430 inhabitants/km2.

References

Neighbourhoods of Barcelona
Sants-Montjuïc